The Riccarton Group is a Silurian lithostratigraphic group (a sequence of rock strata) in southern Scotland and northern England. The name is derived from Riccarton in the Edinburgh area. The rocks of the Riccarton Group have also previously been known as the Riccarton Formation and the Riccarton and Raeberry Castle Beds. The Group comprises around 500m thickness of greywackes, mudstones and siltstones which are faulted and folded.

References

 

Silurian System of Europe
Geology of England
Geology of Scotland
Geological groups of the United Kingdom
Geologic formations of the United Kingdom